Zhou Cheng is a fictional character appearing in American comic books published by Marvel Comics.

Lewis Tan portrayed the character in an episode of the first season of the Netflix Marvel Cinematic Universe television series Iron Fist.

Publication history

Zhou Cheng first appears in The Immortal Iron Fist #17 and was created by Duane Swierczynski and Travel Foreman.

Fictional character biography
Zhou Cheng has been killing previous Iron Fists for seventy-five years. He was under the mind control of Ch'i-Lin and attempted to capture and kill Danny Rand's ancestor Orson Randall and steal his heart. His reason for this was so that he can gain access to the Dragon's egg for his master to consume it. He attacks Danny on his thirty-third birthday, but is stopped by the combined effort of Luke Cage, Misty Knight and Colleen Wing. He then attacked the Thunder Dojo to lure Danny out, but Danny brought the Immortal Weapons to aid him. Zhou was able to sense Danny's chi, but was unable to detect the Immortal Weapons which foiled his plans.

It is later revealed that he had been secretly taking over Rand Corp. alongside Danny's secretary Nadine, who was also Zhou's girlfriend. They attempted to poison Danny through his tea, but he was rescued once again by Cage and Knight. Zhou disregards Nadine after she reveals that she is pregnant and proceeds to fight Danny to the death. Danny defeats and kills Zhou when he decides to not use his chi, Zhou was only able to defeat Danny by sensing his chi energy and anticipating his move set.

In other media
Zhou Cheng appears in Iron Fist played by Lewis Tan, who had initially auditioned for the title role. Zhou Cheng appears in the episode "The Blessing of Many Fractures" as "the sworn defender of the Hand" under Wilson Fisk's former ally Madame Gao, guarding one of her facilities in China. Rather than being possessed by Ch'i-Lin, he was trained separately by him and taught to consume large amounts of alcohol to "tame [his] inner dragon". Due to this he fights using drunken fist style which actually proves to be effective against Danny Rand. Cheng gets tossed through the entrance to the facility where Danny proceeds to punch him brutally before being stopped by Colleen Wing and Claire Temple.

References

Comics characters introduced in 2008
Marvel Comics martial artists
Marvel Comics supervillains